Antillea pelops is a butterfly of the family Nymphalidae. It is found in the Caribbean, including Cuba, Hispaniola, Jamaica, Puerto Rico, Montserrat and Saint Kitts.

The length of the forewings is 10–12 mm for males and 11–13 mm for females.

The larvae feed on Blechum pyramidatum and Justicia comata.

Subspecies
A. p. pelops
A. p. anacaona (Herrich-Schäffer, 1865) (Cuba)
A. p. pygmaea (Godart, 1819) (Jamaica)

External links
"Antillea Higgins, [1959]" at Markku Savela's Lepidoptera and Some Other Life Forms

Melitaeini
Taxa named by Dru Drury
Butterflies described in 1773
Butterflies of the Caribbean